Speerville is a rural community in New Brunswick, Canada. It is home to the Speerville Flour Mill, which opened in 1982.

History
Speerville was settled in 1820 by William, John, and James Speer. In 1878, a post office opened with Oliver Speer as the first postmaster. By 1898, Speerville had a population of 100.

See also
List of communities in New Brunswick

References

Communities in Carleton County, New Brunswick